Aifric (Middle Irish Affraic) is an Irish language female given name. Affraic is attested as a name borne by women of Gaelic background, between the 8th and 15th centuries. Described as "now very rare" in 1923, it has been revived somewhat in Ireland as part of a general increase in the use of Irish-language names.

Bearers of the name

Medieval
 Aifricci, abbess of Kildare, died 743.
 Affraic, abbess of Kildare, died 833.
 Affraic, daughter of Fergus of Galloway who married Óláfr Guðrøðarson in the 1130s
 Affreca de Courcy, wife of John de Courcy and daughter of Guðrøðr Óláfsson, died in or after 1216. 
 Aiffric, daughter of Briain Ui Raighillaigh and wife of Briain Meg Tigernain, died 1365.
 Aiffric, daughter of Aodh Uí Néill and wife of Henri Aimhreidh Uí Néill, died 1389.
 Aiffric, daughter of Ua Banain and wife Philip Mag Uidhir, died 1468.
 Aiffric, daughter of Emaínn son of Tomas Mag Uidhir and wife of wife of Cairpre, son of Aedh Ua Neill, died 1479.
Modern
 Aifric Keogh, Irish Olympic rower, bronze medal coxless four, Tokyo 2021.
 Aifric Mac Aodha, poet and editor of Irish-language journal Comhar, born 1979.
 Aifric Campbell, author.
Afric McGlinchey, poet, book editor , reviewer  and critic ; winner of the 2010 Hennessy Poetry Award . Lives in West Cork.

Fictional
 Aifric - title character of an Irish-language TV series aimed at young teenagers.
 "When Aifric and I put in at that little creek", a poem by Paul Muldoon.

References

Irish-language feminine given names